Il talismano may refer to:

Il talismano della felicità, cookbook by Ada Boni 1929
Il talismano (it) opera by Salieri, commedia per musica in 3 acts by Goldoni, revised by Da Ponte
Il talismano (Pacini), opera by Giovanni Pacini 1832
Il talismano (Balfe), Italian opera by Michael William Balfe, originally written as an English opera, completed by Michael Costa, June 11, 1874 at Drury Lane in London

See also
Talisman (disambiguation)